Mangawhai is a locality in Northland, New Zealand around the Mangawhai Harbour. The township of Mangawhai is at the south west extent of the harbour, and the township of Mangawhai Heads is 5 km north east. Kaiwaka is 13 km south west, and Waipu is 20 km north west of Mangawhai Heads.

In 2018 a proposal was made to develop a new town between Mangawhai and Mangawhai Heads, called Mangawhai Central, to accommodate the rapid increase of population expected in the area and overcome the space limitations of the existing commercial areas.

Mangawhai Museum, opened in 2014,  features displays on the area's local history.

History

Mangawhai is the traditional Māori name for the area, referring to the stingrays which live in the harbour.

In the early and mid 19th century, Mangawhai Harbour was one of the main access points for the Kaipara. Ngāti Whātua used to drag waka from Kaiwaka to Mangawhai. A Ngā Puhi war party landed at Mangawhai in February 1825 and moved 12 km inland to confront the Ngāti Whātua at Te Ika-a-ranga-nui near Kaiwaka.

Later in the 19th century, settlers would travel by boat from Auckland to Mangawhai, walk to Kaiwaka, and then travel on the water again across the Kaipara Harbour. By the early 1860s, a dray road existed between Mangawhai and Kaiwaka. In the latter 19th century, the kauri gum digging trade became an important industry in the area.

Sand mining
Sand mining began at the Mangawhai Harbour entrance pre 1940. In 1978 the collapse of sand dunes, believed to be caused by sand mining, closed the harbour for five and a half years.

From 1993 to 2004, sand was commercially suction-dredged from the sandbars of Mangawhai Heads. In 2004, the Mangawhai Harbour Restoration Society won an Environment Court decision to stop the issue of new licences. The companies such as McCallum Brothers, re-applied to the Auckland Regional Council for resource consent but the application was turned down in 2005.

In January 2008 another application to sand mine in the Mangawhai Forest was being heard by the Environment Court.

Demographics

Mangawhai had a population of 936 at the 2018 New Zealand census, an increase of 429 people (84.6%) since the 2013 census, and an increase of 588 people (169.0%) since the 2006 census. There were 387 households, comprising 450 males and 486 females, giving a sex ratio of 0.93 males per female. The median age was 53.5 years (compared with 37.4 years nationally), with 168 people (17.9%) aged under 15 years, 96 (10.3%) aged 15 to 29, 354 (37.8%) aged 30 to 64, and 318 (34.0%) aged 65 or older.

Ethnicities were 93.6% European/Pākehā, 14.1% Māori, 2.2% Pacific peoples, 2.9% Asian, and 1.3% other ethnicities. People may identify with more than one ethnicity.

The percentage of people born overseas was 19.9, compared with 27.1% nationally.

Although some people chose not to answer the census's question about religious affiliation, 59.9% had no religion, 29.2% were Christian, 0.3% were Hindu, 0.3% were Muslim, 0.6% were Buddhist and 2.2% had other religions.

Of those at least 15 years old, 111 (14.5%) people had a bachelor's or higher degree, and 156 (20.3%) people had no formal qualifications. The median income was $24,600, compared with $31,800 nationally. 90 people (11.7%) earned over $70,000 compared to 17.2% nationally. The employment status of those at least 15 was that 264 (34.4%) people were employed full-time, 129 (16.8%) were part-time, and 27 (3.5%) were unemployed.

Rural surrounds

Mangawhai Rural had a population of 2,100 at the 2018 New Zealand census, an increase of 702 people (50.2%) since the 2013 census, and an increase of 1,068 people (103.5%) since the 2006 census. There were 819 households, comprising 1,041 males and 1,062 females, giving a sex ratio of 0.98 males per female. The median age was 50.2 years (compared with 37.4 years nationally), with 375 people (17.9%) aged under 15 years, 207 (9.9%) aged 15 to 29, 1,086 (51.7%) aged 30 to 64, and 432 (20.6%) aged 65 or older.

Ethnicities were 93.7% European/Pākehā, 11.9% Māori, 2.9% Pacific peoples, 1.9% Asian, and 2.3% other ethnicities. People may identify with more than one ethnicity.

The percentage of people born overseas was 21.3, compared with 27.1% nationally.

Although some people chose not to answer the census's question about religious affiliation, 60.7% had no religion, 28.9% were Christian, 0.6% were Hindu, 0.6% were Buddhist and 2.3% had other religions.

Of those at least 15 years old, 330 (19.1%) people had a bachelor's or higher degree, and 264 (15.3%) people had no formal qualifications. The median income was $29,000, compared with $31,800 nationally. 261 people (15.1%) earned over $70,000 compared to 17.2% nationally. The employment status of those at least 15 was that 771 (44.7%) people were employed full-time, 324 (18.8%) were part-time, and 45 (2.6%) were unemployed.

Education
Mangawhai Beach School is a coeducational full primary (years 1-8) school with a decile rating of 6 and a roll of  students as of

References

Kaipara District
Populated places in the Northland Region